Platensina acrostacta is a species of tephritid or fruit flies in the genus Platensina of the family Tephritidae.

Distribution
Pakistan, India, Sri Lanka, Bangladesh, Thailand, Cambodia.

References

Tephritinae
Insects described in 1911
Diptera of Asia